This is a list of cities, towns and villages in the province of Gelderland, in the Netherlands.

Sources 
GEOnet Names Server (GNS)

 
Lists of coordinates
Gelderland